WRNT-LD, virtual and UHF digital channel 32, is a low-powered television station licensed to Hartford, Connecticut, United States. The station is owned by HC2 Holdings, and carries the public domain network Timeless TV on its primary channel.

History 
The station’s construction permit was issued on June 12, 1997 under the callsign of W06BL, moving immediately to W05CF. On November 2, 1998, it changed to WMLD-LP.  On February 24, 2004, it changed again to WRNT-LP.  The current callsign WRNT-LD was assigned on December 29, 2015.

Digital channels
The station's digital signal is multiplexed:

References

External links

Low-power television stations in the United States
Innovate Corp.
RNT-LD
Television channels and stations established in 1997
1997 establishments in Connecticut